The Statute of Autonomy of the Basque Country of 1936 was the first statute of autonomy of the Basque Country. It was approved by the Cortes Generales of the Second Spanish Republic on 1 October 1936 in Valencia, in the midst of the Spanish Civil War. After the approval of the Statute, the first autonomous government was formed, led by José Antonio Aguirre (EAJ-PNV) and with the participation of the PSOE, PCE, EAE-ANV, Republican Left and Republican Union.

Timeline

References

1936 in the Basque Country (autonomous community)
1936